John Webster (c. 1580–c. 1634) was an English dramatist and contemporary of William Shakespeare.

John Webster may also refer to:

Government
John Webster (governor) (1590–1661), Governor of the Colony of Connecticut
John Webster (MP) (1810–1891), Member of Parliament for Aberdeen
John Webster (Canadian politician) (1856–1928), Member of Parliament and Senator
J. Stanley Webster (1877–1962), American politician and judge, U.S. Representative from Washington
John M. Webster (1877–1963), American mayor of Somerville, Massachusetts

Sports
Chick Webster (John Robert Webster, 1920–2018), ice hockey player
Jack Webster (cricketer) (1917–1997), English cricketer
John Webster (footballer) (fl. 1889–1898), English footballer
John Ray Webster (born 1942), American checkers player

Other
John Webster (minister) (1610–1682), English clergyman and controversial writer
John Webster (mycologist) (1925–2014), English mycologist and professor at University of Exeter
John Webster (orator) (1913–2008), aka Mohammed Jonn Webster, Anglo/Australian speaker and soap box activist
John White Webster (1793–1850), Harvard University professor convicted of killing colleague George Parkman
John Webster (engineer) (1845–1914), English civil engineer and bridge designer
John Webster (doctor) (born 1936), pioneer in the field of IVF, obstetrician and gynaecologist
John P. Webster, Canadian Bank Executive and Senior Liberal Party Adviser
John Clarence Webster (1863–1950), Canadian physician and historian
John Dodsley Webster (1840–1913), English architect
John Webster (Royal Navy officer) (1932–2020), British admiral
John Webster (musician), musician, engineer and producer who primarily plays keyboards
John G. Webster, pioneer of the field of biomedical engineering
John Adams Webster (1789–1877), U.S. Navy officer
Jack Webster (journalist) (1918–1999), Scottish-born Canadian journalist, radio and television personality
Jack Webster (police officer) (1923–2002), police officer, administrator and police historian in Toronto, Canada
John Webster (The Inbetweeners)
John Webster (theologian) (1955–2016), British Anglican systematic theologian
John D. Webster  (died December 27, 1887), a state legislator, government official, and lawyer in Mississippi.

See also 
Jack Webster (disambiguation)